Groovin' at Smalls' Paradise is a live album by American jazz organist Jimmy Smith, featuring performances recorded at Smalls Paradise in New York City in 1957 and originally released in two volumes on the Blue Note label. The album was rereleased as a double CD with four bonus tracks recorded at the same performance.

The organ heard on this album is distinctive from most Jimmy Smith recordings in that the percussion on-off switch was either broken or Smith deliberately set the switch to a position halfway between on and off.  This prevented the single-triggered percussion tone from decaying; since the percussion tone is also not routed through the vibrato circuit, the effect is quite unusual.

Reception
Awarding it a four-star rating, The Penguin Guide to Jazz selected the CD reissue as part of its suggested “core collection” of essential recordings.  The editors at Allmusic awarded the album 4½ stars.

Track listing
Disc One
 "Imagination" (Johnny Burke, Jimmy Van Heusen) – 7:56
 "Walkin'" (Richard Carpenter) – 11:41 Bonus track on CD reissue
 "My Funny Valentine" (Lorenz Hart, Richard Rodgers) – 11:03
 "It's Only a Paper Moon" (Harold Arlen, E. Y. Harburg, Billy Rose) – 10:28 Bonus track on CD reissue
 "I Can't Give You Anything But Love" (Dorothy Fields, Jimmy McHugh) – 7:00 Bonus track on CD reissue
 "Laura" (Johnny Mercer, David Raksin) – 10:28
Disc Two
 "(Back Home Again in) Indiana" (James F. Hanley, Ballard MacDonald) – 15:40
 "Body and Soul" (Edward Heyman, Robert Sour, Frank Eyton, Johnny Green) – 10:03
 "The Champ" (Dizzy Gillespie) – 13:47 Bonus track on CD reissue
 "Lover Man" (Jimmy Davis, Ram Ramirez, James Sherman) – 7:28
 "Slightly Monkish" (Jimmy Smith) – 6:59
 "After Hours" (Erskine Hawkins, Avery Parrish) – 10:58
 "Just Friends" (John Klenner, Sam M. Lewis) – 6:29
Recorded at Small's Paradise in New York City on November 15, 1957

Personnel

Musicians
 Jimmy Smith – organ
 Eddie McFadden – guitar
 Donald Bailey – drums

Technical
 Alfred Lion – producer
 Rudy Van Gelder – engineer
 Reid Miles – cover design
 Francis Wolff – photography
 Leonard Feather – liner notes

References

Blue Note Records live albums
Jimmy Smith (musician) live albums
1957 live albums
Albums produced by Alfred Lion